The White feather Spring is in the Argentine section of Kansas City, Kansas. It is on private property. White Feather Spring gets its name from Susan White Feather, the first property owner after the Treaty of 1854 land parceling.

History

In 1826, Tenskwatawa established a village at a site in modern Kansas City, Kansas. Tensquatawa, known as the Shawnee Prophet, was the younger brother of the Shawnee war chief, Tecumseh. Tensquatawa built Prophetstown near the present South 26th Street and Woodend Avenue in Kansas City, Kansas. He later moved from there to White Feather Spring. He died here in November 1836 (located in the Argentine, Kansas; the White Feather Spring marker notes the location).

The grave of the Prophet, about seventy-five or a hundred yards to the northwest of his home, was not marked for around sixty years. An editor of the Kansas City Sun, E. F. Heisler, in 1897 went to the Indian Territory and got Charles Bluejacket, who had been present at the Prophet's burial when he was 20 yrs. old, to locate the grave. He located the natural spring, that still flows today, where the Prophets home was and told those present where the Prophet's grave was. A temporary marker was placed but later removed. No permanent marker was put down and the exact grave location today is not known.

Notes and Citations

Natural features on the National Register of Historic Places in Kansas
History of Kansas City, Kansas
Geography of Wyandotte County, Kansas
Geography of Kansas City, Kansas
National Register of Historic Places in Kansas City, Kansas
Springs of Kansas
Shawnee history
Native American history of Kansas